Kedron Creek is a stream in the U.S. state of Minnesota.

The stream was named after the Kidron Valley near Jerusalem.

See also
List of rivers of Minnesota

References

Rivers of Fillmore County, Minnesota
Rivers of Mower County, Minnesota
Rivers of Minnesota